James Kerguelen Robinson (11 March 1859 – 1914) was an Australian prospector who was the first person born south of the Antarctic Convergence. Robinson Pass was named after him.

Life
Robinson was born in March 1859 on the Kerguelen Islands to James William Robinson, a captain and sailor, and his wife Jane Parsons Bentley while the couple was on a sealing voyage in the Antarctic Convergence. Robinson's middle name, Kerguelen, was taken from the island he was born on. Robinson Pass was named after him.

He married Alice Maud Wakefield in 1889.

Robinson died of dehydration in Murchison in 1914 while he was prospecting in the western Australian desert.

See also 
 Emilio Palma
 Solveig Gunbjørg Jacobsen

References

External links
 Geni profile

1859 births
1914 deaths
Australian prospectors
Deaths by dehydration
Accidental deaths in Western Australia